Camino Garrigó was a Spanish film actress. She appeared in twenty eight films, generally in supporting roles such as While Angels Sleep (1947).

Selected filmography
 The Complete Idiot (1939)
 Whirlwind (1941)
 Journey to Nowhere (1942)
 Traces of Light (1943)
 House of Cards (1943)
 The Phantom and Dona Juanita (1945)
 While Angels Sleep (1947)
 The Faith (1947)
 Nobody's Wife (1950)
 Our Lady of Fatima (1951)
 Facing the Sea (1951)
 The Song of Sister Maria (1952)

References

Bibliography 
 Lancia, Enrico. Amedeo Nazzari. Gremese Editore, 1983.

External links 
 

Year of birth unknown
1954 deaths
Spanish film actresses